Zireiner See is a lake of Tyrol, Austria. It lies between the Rosskogel (1940  m asl) in the east and the Rofanspitze in the west in the hollow, on the north side of foothills of the Marchspitze (2004  m above sea level ) and in the south of the Latschberg (1949  m above sea level) A.) is formed. At the western end, a spring feeds the lake.

From the mountain station of the Sonnwendjochbahn the lake can be reached in an hour. The E4 European long distance path touches the Zireiner See on its stage between Steinberg at Rofan and Maurach.

Weblinks 

 Beschreibung des Zireiner Sees

Single Signature
https://www.tirol.gv.at/statistik-budget/tiris/

Lakes of Tyrol (state)